Ianthe (Ἰάνθη; English translation: "purple or azul flower") may refer to:

Greek mythology
 Ianthe, Cretan girl who married Iphis after Isis turned Iphis from a woman into a man
 Ianthe (mythology), one of the 3,000 Oceanids

People
 Ianthe Elizabeth Brautigan (born 1960), American writer, daughter of Richard Brautigan 
 Ianthe Jeanne Dugan, investigative reporter for the Wall Street Journal
 Ianthe, Lord Byron's nickname for Lady Charlotte Harley, to whom Childe Harold's Pilgrimage is dedicated
 Ianthe,  Walter Savage Landor's nickname for his unrequited love Sophia Jane Swift
 Ianthe, nickname of actress Mary Saunderson
 Ianthe, a pen-name of Emma Catherine Embury

Fiction
 Ianthe, character in Queen Mab (poem) by Percy Bysshe Shelley who named a daughter Ianthe (1813–1876)
 Ianthe, love interest of the main character in John William Polidori's The Vampyre
 Ianthe, character in Roelstra's Line in the Dragon Prince series
 Ianthe, fictional city in works by Robert E. Howard
 Ianthe, character in An Unsuitable Attachment, a posthumous work by Barbara Pym
 Ianthe, character in Sylvester, or the Wicked Uncle, a 1957 book by Georgette Heyer
 Ianthe, character in A Court Of Mist And Fury, 2016 book by Sarah J. Maas
 Ianthe, character in House of Names, 2017 book by Colm Tóibín
 Ianthe, spirit in "Al Aaraaf," 1829 poem by Edgar Allan Poe
 Ianthe, character in The Locked Tomb series by Tamsyn Muir

Species
 Kylix ianthe, a sea snail in the family Drilliidae
 Pieris ianthe; see Belenois hedyle
 Dichomeris ianthes; see Dichomeris acuminata
 Pseudoneptis bugandensis ianthe; see Pseudoneptis

Other
 Lake Ianthe, a lake on the West Coast of New Zealand 's South Island
 98 Ianthe, a main belt asteroid 
 Ianthe, Trademark owned by Ian Heath Ltd of Birmingham, England in silverware goods. 
 Ianthe, fabric and leatherwork pattern owned by Liberty of London Co. 

Given names derived from plants or flowers